Prince Waldemar William Louis Frederick Victor of Prussia (20 March 1889 at Kiel – 2 May 1945 at Tutzing, Bavaria) was the eldest son of Prince Henry of Prussia and his wife, Princess Irene of Hesse and by Rhine.

Biography

Marriage
Waldemar married Princess Calixta of Lippe-Biesterfeld (14 October 1895 – 15 December 1982) on 14 August 1919 at Hemmelmark. They had no children, and resided in Bavaria.

Haemophilia and death
Waldemar, like his maternal first cousin, Tsarevich Alexei Nikolaevich of Russia; maternal uncle Prince Friedrich of Hesse and by Rhine; and youngest brother Heinrich, had haemophilia. He died in a clinic in Tutzing, Bavaria because of the lack of blood transfusion facilities. He and his wife fled their home in light of the Russian advance, arriving in Tutzing, where Waldemar was able to receive his last blood transfusion. The U.S. Army overran the area the next day, on 1 May 1945, and diverted all medical resources to treat nearby concentration camp victims, preventing Waldemar's doctor from treating him. Waldemar died the following day, on 2 May.

Honours and awards
Prince Waldemar received the following awards:
  Knight of the Black Eagle, with Collar (Kingdom of Prussia)
  Grand Cross of the Red Eagle, with Crown (Kingdom of Prussia)
  Knight of the Prussian Crown, 1st Class (Kingdom of Prussia)
  Grand Commander of the Royal House Order of Hohenzollern (Kingdom of Prussia)
  Cross of Honour of the Princely House Order of Hohenzollern, 1st Class (House of Hohenzollern-Sigmaringen)
  Knight of the House Order of Fidelity, 1909 (Grand Duchy of Baden)
  Grand Cross of the Ludwig Order, 19 March 1910 (Grand Duchy of Hesse and by Rhine)
  Knight of the Rue Crown (Kingdom of Saxony)
  Grand Cordon of the Order of the Chrysanthemum, 6 May 1912 (Empire of Japan)
  Grand Cross of St. Alexander, with Swords, 1916 (Kingdom of Bulgaria)

Ancestry

References

External links

1889 births
1945 deaths
Haemophilia in European royalty
Prussian princes
House of Hohenzollern
Deaths from blood disease